Foy's Lake is a man-made lake in Chittagong, Bangladesh. It was created in 1924 by constructing a dam across the stream that came down from the hills in the northern part of Chittagong. The purpose of creating an artificial lake was to provide water to the residents of the railway colony. It was named after Mr. Foy, a Railway engineer, believed to materialize said project. Pahartali was essentially a railway town containing a workshop, yard, and shed. Presently, a carriage workshop, diesel workshop, loco shed, laboratory, stores, electric workshop, school (established in 1924) are located here. A good number of railway employees reside in the nearby colony.

The area belongs to Railway. However, an amusement park, managed by the Concord Group, is located here.

Gallery

External links

Faiz Lake. In: GeoNames.org

References

Reservoirs in Bangladesh
Tourist attractions in Chittagong Division
Geography of Chittagong